Coptotriche is a genus of moths in the family Tischeriidae, described by the English politician and amateur entomologist, the 6th Baron Walsingham in 1890.

Species

 Coptotriche admirabilis
 Coptotriche aenea
 Coptotriche africana 
 Coptotriche agrimoniella 
 Coptotriche alavelona 
 Coptotriche amelanchieris 
 Coptotriche arizonica
 Coptotriche badiiella
 Coptotriche basipectinella 
 Coptotriche berberella 
 Coptotriche castaneaeella
 Coptotriche citrinipennella 
 Coptotriche clemensella 
 Coptotriche concolor
 Coptotriche confusa
 Coptotriche consanguinea
 Coptotriche crataegifoliae 
 Coptotriche discreta 
 Coptotriche distincta 
 Coptotriche forsteroniae
 Coptotriche fuscomarginella 
 Coptotriche heinemanni 
 Coptotriche inexpectata
 Coptotriche insolita 
 Coptotriche japoniella
 Coptotriche kenyensis 
 Coptotriche longiciliatella
 Coptotriche lucida 
 Coptotriche malifoliella 
 Coptotriche marginea
 Coptotriche mediostriata
 Coptotriche perplexa 
 Coptotriche pulverea 
 Coptotriche purinosella
 Coptotriche roseticola 
 Coptotriche simulata 
 Coptotriche singularis
 Coptotriche splendida
 Coptotriche subnubila 
 Coptotriche tantalella
 Coptotriche zelleriella
 Coptotriche zimbabwiensis

References

Tischeriidae
Monotrysia genera
Taxa named by Thomas de Grey, 6th Baron Walsingham